Evgeni Gegechkori (20 January 1881, in Martvili – 5 June 1954, in Paris) was a Georgian nobleman, politician, and Social Democratic revolutionary.

Born of a noble family, he entered the Social Democratic student movement in 1903 during his studies at the Moscow University and soon joined the Menshevik wing of the Russian Social Democratic Labour Party. He was involved in the 1905 revolution in Georgia and was elected a member to the Third State Duma for the Kutais Governorate from 1907 to 1912. During the February Revolution in 1917, Gegechkori became commissar for the Russian Provisional Government in western Georgia. From 28 November 1917 to 26 March 1918 he chaired the Transcaucasian Commissariat and served as minister of labor before leading the Transcaucasian Sejm and becoming its minister of war. After the establishment of the Democratic Republic of Georgia in May 1918, he became its Minister of Foreign Affairs. In 1921, he briefly served as a Minister of Justice. After the Red Army invasion of Georgia, Gegechkori left for France in March 1921. From 1953 until his death, he headed the Georgian government in exile.

References 
 Mikaberidze, Alexander (ed., 2007), Gegechkori, Evgeni. Dictionary of Georgian National Biography. Retrieved on April 29, 2007.
 Jones, Stephen F. (2005), Socialism in Georgian Colors: The European Road to Social Democracy, 1883-1917. Harvard University Press, .
 The history of the Ministry of Justice of Georgia. Ministry of Justice of Georgia. Accessed on November 20, 2007.

Bibliography

External links
(French) Evguéni Guéguétchkori.
(French) Ière République de Géorgie .
(French) Ière République de Géorgie en exil .

1881 births
1954 deaths
People from Samegrelo-Zemo Svaneti
People from Kutais Governorate
Mingrelians
Russian Social Democratic Labour Party members
Mensheviks
Members of the 3rd State Duma of the Russian Empire
Russian Constituent Assembly members
Social Democratic Party of Georgia politicians
Foreign Ministers of Georgia
Diplomats of Georgia (country)
Revolutionaries from Georgia (country)
Members of the Grand Orient of Russia's Peoples
Imperial Moscow University alumni
Georgian exiles
Georgian emigrants to France
Burials at Leuville cemetery